Alexandr Shabliy (born April 18, 1993) is a Russian mixed martial artist who competes in the Lightweight division of Bellator MMA. As of March 14, 2023, he is #2 in the Bellator Lightweight Rankings.

Background 
Alexander was born in the city of Rostov-on-Don to a Russian father and Dargin mother, Shabliy practices Eastern Orthodoxy. With his grandfather being a Cossack, he incorporates into his post-fight speechs by the way of his headgear. In parallel with going to first grade, his parents enrolled him in the Shotokan karate section, where the guy went three times a week. Since study and training took up all his free time, in the dashing 90s, Shabliy simply had no time to get involved with bad company. He achieved good results in sports, and graduated from school with good marks.

A key role in the development of Sasha as a fighter was played by his coach, Belousov Nikolai Pavlovich, who directed his student in the right direction and introduced him to mixed martial arts. However, this happened much later, and until that moment the athlete competed, won the first victories, which was encouraged by his father. Despite the fact that the house of the Shabliyev family burned down and they were forced to move to a hostel, Vasily found an opportunity to reward his son for the victory with a small amount of money.

Over time, along with his friend, Alexander switched to boxing, then to Thai boxing, and after that - combat sambo and hand-to-hand combat.

Mixed martial arts career

Early career
But, by the time he came of age, he was first invited to the ProFC event, where he made his lightweight debut as a professional MMA fighter. But, in parallel with this career, he managed to take care of his personal life, education and a good position.

The first 4 fights under the auspices of the domestic promotion, which Shabliy completed quite quickly, finishing his opponents with three submissions and one technical knockout. But in October 2011, he suffered his first loss to Mamour Fall, although the fight was very close and he lost by split decision. After, the athlete tried himself in the Oplot Challenge, but eventually returned to ProFC, starting to smash both foreign and Russian fighters there.

Arsen Ubaidulaev became the second opponent to defeat him, submitting Shabliy with a rear-naked choke. However, Alexander rematched Arsen and knocked him out with a flying knee in the first round. Then, the prospect racked up victories after victories, and entered such leagues as ACB and Fight Nights Global. There he had a chance to meet with more serious opposition, but only Eduard Vartanyan managed to stop the representative of the Peresvet team, beating him by the way of split decision.

Having scored a solid record in Russia, Shabliy decided to temporarily move to the United States in order to gain experience from Western colleagues, and to try to sign with a Western promotion. When the arrival to the States took place, the athlete was accepted into the American Top Team, where he trained for 4 months, but he did not succeed in becoming part of a major promotion. As the pandemic hit,  Alexander had to return to his homeland.

However, after a short period of time, his manager went to Bellator, and after fruitful negotiations, the parties managed to come to a common denominator.

Bellator MMA
In February 2021, it was announced that Shabliy had signed a multi-fight deal with Bellator MMA.

He made his promotional debut on May 21, 2021 at Bellator 259, defeating Alfie Davis, a Briton with 4 win streak, via unanimous decision.

In his sophomore performance, Shabliy faced Bobby King on December 3, 2021 at Bellator 279, defeating his opponent via unanimous decision.

Shabliy faced former Lightweight champion Brent Primus at Bellator 282 on June 24, 2022. He picked up his first stoppage in the promotion, winning the bout via TKO in the second round.

Lightweight Grand Prix 
On January 11, 2023, Shabliy was announced as one of the 8 participants in the $1 million Lightweight Grand Prix, with his quarterfinal bout against Tofiq Musayev taking place on March 10, 2023 at Bellator 292. Shabliy won the bout in the third round, finishing Musayev with a body kick that rendered him unable to continue.

Personal life 
The athlete is married to a girl named Maria, whom they married when he was 20 years old, and the couple has two sons - Timur and Dima. In addition, along with the career of a deputy, Shabliy became the director of the very ProFC league in which he began his fighting path. Shabliy studied at the Russian State University of Justice, where he study a degree of law, which he uses as a deputy of the Rostov City Duma.

Mixed martial arts record

|-
|Win
|align=center|23–3
|Tofiq Musayev
|TKO (body kick) 
|Bellator 292
|
|align=center|3
|align=center|0:29
|San Jose, California, United States
|
|-
|Win
|align=center|22–3
|Brent Primus
|TKO (punches)
|Bellator 282
|
|align=center|2
|align=center|1:22
|Uncasville, Connecticut, United States
|
|-
|Win
|align=center|21–3
|Bobby King
|Decision (unanimous)
|Bellator 272
|
|align=center|3
|align=center|5:00
|Uncasville, Connecticut, United States
|
|-
|Win
|align=center|20–3
|Alfie Davis
|Decision (unanimous)
|Bellator 259
|
|align=center|3
|align=center|5:00
|Uncasville, Connecticut, United States
|
|-
|Win
|align=center|19–3
|Alexandre Cidade
|Decision (unanimous)
|ProFC 66
|
|align=center|3
|align=center|5:00
|Rostov-on-Don, Russia
|
|-
|Win
|align=center|18–3
|Adriano Martins
|Decision (unanimous)
|Fight Nights Global 87
|
|align=center|3
|align=center|5:00
|Rostov-on-Don, Russia
|
|-
|Win
|align=center|17–3
|Miroslav Štrbák
|KO (punch)
|Fight Nights Global 82
|
|align=center|2
|align=center|3:02
|Moscow, Russia
|
|-
|Win
|align=center|16–3
|Gleristone Santos
|KO (knee and punches)
|ACB 67
|
|align=center|1
|align=center|2:41
|Grozny, Russia
|
|-
|Loss
|align=center|15–3
|Eduard Vartanyan
|Decision (split)
|ACB 49
|
|align=center|3
|align=center|5:00
|Rostov-on-Don, Russia
|
|-
|Win
|align=center|15–2
|Michael Brightmon
|TKO (punches)
|ACB 41
|
|align=center|1
|align=center|1:07
|Sochi, Russia
|
|-
|Win
|align=center|14–2
|Ryan Quinn
|KO (head kick)
|WFCA 16
|
|align=center|3
|align=center|0:13
|Grozny, Russia
|
|-
|Win
|align=center|13–2
|Haotian Wu
|TKO (punches)
|Kunlun Fight 29
|
|align=center|1
|align=center|3:05
|Sochi, Russia
|
|-
|Win
|align=center|12–2
|Gusein Esenbaev
|TKO (flying knee & punches)
|ProFC 57
|
|align=center|1
|align=center|4:07
|Rostov-On-Don, Russia
|
|-
|Win
|align=center|11–2
|Haitham ElSayed
|Submission (heel hook)
|ProFC 56
|
|align=center|1
|align=center|1:29
|Kursk, Russia
|
|-
|Win
|align=center|10–2
|Luca Puggioni
|Submission (heel hook)
|ProFC 55
|
|align=center|1
|align=center|1:09
|Krasnodar, Russia
|
|-
|Win
|align=center|9–2
|Arsen Ubaidulaev
|KO (flying knee)
|ProFC 53
|
|align=center|1
|align=center|1:48
|Rostov-On-Don, Russia
|
|-
|Loss
|align=center|8–2
|Arsen Ubaidulaev
|Submission (rear-naked choke)
|ProFC 49
|
|align=center|2
|align=center|2:18
|Khimki, Russia
|
|-
|Win
|align=center|8–1
|Michael Doyle
|TKO (punches)
|ProFC 47
|
|align=center|1
|align=center|0:34
|Rostov-On-Don, Russia
|
|-
| Win
| align=center|7–1
| Tarkan Ali Erokcu
|TKO (punches)
|ProFC 45
|
|align=center|1
|align=center|0:17
|Grozny, Russia
|
|-
| Win
| align=center|6–1
| Arvydas Zilius
|Submission (armbar)
|ProFC 41
|
|align=center|1
|align=center|1:53
|Rostov-On-Don, Russia
|
|-
| Win
| align=center|5–1
| Abudokar Dukarey
|Submission (triangle choke)
|Oplot Challenge 1
|
|align=center|1
|align=center|1:05
|Kharkiv, Ukraine
|
|-
| Loss
| align=center|4–1
| Mamour Fall
|Decision (split)
|ProFC 36
|
|align=center|3
|align=center|5:00
|Khasavyurt, Russia
|
|-
| Win
| align=center| 4–0
| Łukasz Bugara
| Submission (guillotine choke)
| ProFC 30
|
| align=center|1
| align=center|0:49
| Rostov-On-Don, Russia
|
|-
| Win
| align=center| 3–0
| Denis Aleksandrov
| Submission (rear-naked choke)
| ProFC 29
| 
| align=center| 2
| align=center| 3:57
| Rostov-on-Don, Russia
|
|-
| Win
| align=center| 2–0
| Semen Selyukov
| TKO (punches)
| ProFC 26
| 
| align=center|2
| align=center|0:36
| Rostov-On-Don, Russia
|
|-
| Win
| align=center| 1–0
| Vahe Zakaryan
| Submission (guillotine choke)
| ProFC 18
| 
| align=center|1
| align=center|1:23
| Nalchik, Russia
|

See also 
 List of current Bellator fighters
 List of male mixed martial artists

References

External links 
 
 

1993 births
Living people
Lightweight mixed martial artists
Russian male mixed martial artists
Bellator male fighters
Eastern Orthodox Christians from Russia